USS Fiske (DE-143) was an  built for the United States Navy during World War II. Named for Rear Admiral Bradley Allen Fiske, she was the first of two U.S. Naval vessels to bear the name. The vessel entered service in 1943 and served in the Atlantic Ocean during World War II as part of a hunter-killer anti-submarine group. Thirty-three of the ship's crew were killed and a further 50 were injured.

Service history
Fiske was laid down 4 January 1943 by the Consolidated Steel Corporation of Orange, Texas; launched 14 March 1943; sponsored by Mrs. H. G. Chalkley; and commissioned 25 August 1943. Fiske began her service as a convoy escort with a voyage from Norfolk to Coco Solo, Panama Canal Zone to New York between 12 and 25 November 1943. On 3 December, the escort ship cleared Norfolk on the first of three convoy assignments from Norfolk and New York to Casablanca. During the third of these, on 20 April 1944 her convoy came under attack by German torpedo bombers in the western Mediterranean, but none of the enemy planes came within range of Fiske.

Five days later her group sailed to patrol across the Atlantic, putting into Casablanca to replenish 20 to 24 July. The contact (north of the Azores), surfaced , quickly dived, but the two escorts picked it up on sonar, and began their attack approach. Suddenly, Fiske was torpedoed on her starboard side amidships, and within 10 minutes, she broke in two and had to be abandoned.

Fiske received one battle star for World War II service.

See also
 See List of U.S. Navy losses in World War II for other Navy ships lost in World War II.

References

External links
 USS Fiske DE-143 at www.desausa.org
 

Edsall-class destroyer escorts
World War II shipwrecks in the Atlantic Ocean
World War II frigates and destroyer escorts of the United States
Ships built in Orange, Texas
1943 ships
Maritime incidents in August 1944
Ships sunk by German submarines in World War II